Indian reservation system may refer to:

 Indian reservation, land reserved for Native American tribes in the United States
 Reservation in India, a form of affirmative action in India